Yamie Grégoire is an Innu actress from Quebec. She is most noted for her performance in the film Kuessipan, for which she received a Canadian Screen Award nomination for Best Supporting Actress at the 8th Canadian Screen Awards.

References

External links

21st-century First Nations people
Actresses from Quebec
Canadian film actresses
First Nations actresses
Innu people
Living people
Year of birth missing (living people)